The Cleveland Indians was the name of Major League Baseball's Cleveland franchise from 1915 to 2021 before they became the Guardians. 

Cleveland Indians may also refer to:
Cleveland Tigers (NFL), National Football League team, which was renamed as the Cleveland Indians in 1921
Cleveland Bulldogs, National Football League team originally named the Cleveland Indians in 1923
Cleveland Indians (NFL 1931), National Football League (1931)
Cleveland Indians (ice hockey), International Hockey League (1929–1934)

See also
 List of Cleveland sports teams